Villa agrippina is a species of bee fly in the family Bombyliidae.

Distribution
United States.

References

Bombyliidae
Insects described in 1886
Taxa named by Carl Robert Osten-Sacken
Diptera of North America